Space Case may refer to the following:
 Space Case (1992 film), starring Bridget Hoffman
 Space Case (2001 film), starring Christopher Lloyd, produced by Weston Woods Studios
 "Space Case", an episode of Big Bad Beetleborgs
 "Space Case", an episode of Reading Rainbow
 "Space Case", an episode of Slimer! and the Real Ghostbusters
 Space Case (Transformers), a character in Transformers, one of the Cyberjets
 Space Case, a 2014 book by Stuart Gibbs, from the Moon Base Alpha series

See also
 Space Cases, a 1996 TV series